Hodoș is a Romanian surname. Notable people with the surname include:

Iosif Hodoșiu
Enea Hodoș, son of Iosif
Ion Gorun (pen name of Alexandru I. Hodoș), brother of Enea
Constanța Hodoș, wife of Alexandru

Romanian-language surnames